Heinrich Friese (Heinrich Friedrich August Karl Ludwig Friese, was born on 4 May, 1860 in Schwerin, and died 8 September, 1948 in Schwerin) was a German biologist and entomologist, specialist of bees (melittologist).
Between 1883 and 1939 he described 1,989 new species and 564 new varieties or subspecies of insects, 99% of which were bees.

Major works 
He has published 270 scientific articles, including a 6-volume report on European bees (1895-1901).
 Die Apidae (Blumenwespen) von Argentina nach den Reisenergebnissen der Herren A. C. Jensen-Haarup und P. Jörgensen in den Jahren 1904—1907, 1908
 Die Bienen Europas (Apidae europaeae). Akademische Druck- und Verlagsanstalt, Graz 1969 (Nachdruck der Erstausgabe 1895—1901)
 Megachilinae, Hymenoptera ; Apidae. Friedländer, Berlin 1911
 Die europäischen Bienen (Apidae) — Das Leben und Wirken unserer Blumenwespen. Eine Darstellung der Lebensweise unserer wilden wie gesellig lebenden Bienen nach eigenen Untersuchungen für Naturfreunde, Lehrer u. Zoologen. Vereinigung Wissenschaftlicher Verleger, Berlin, Leipzig 1922

Tributes
The bee genus Eufriesea is named after him, along with stingless bee (Meliponini) genus Frieseomelitta, as well as a number of separate species such as Megachile friesei and Sphecodes friesei.

References

External links

 
 
 Heinrich Friese on www.culturaapicola.com wiki (Spanish)
 Heinrich Friese on mecklenburg-natur.de (German)

German entomologists
19th-century German zoologists
20th-century German zoologists
Hymenopterists
1860 births
1948 deaths